BitPass was an American company from 2002-2007 that developed an online payment system for digital content and services including micropayments. One of its best-known projects was the Mperia online music store catering to unsigned artists.

Background

Kurt Huang and Gyuchang Jun founded BitPass. Michael O'Donnell was brought on as CEO in 2004, but left by April 2005, and was eventually replaced by Doug Knopper in November 2005.

Although the origins of the idea for the company dated back to 1999, the company incorporated and got off the ground with $1.5 million in joint venture funding led by Garage Technology Ventures in late 2002. The first test version of the product was launched in June 2003.  In late 2004, a second funding round of $11.75 million was announced.

For the content buyer, Bitpass worked like a pre-paid telephone card: the buyer signed up for the service and put money into an account using a credit card or PayPal.  This stored-value amount could be used to purchase digital content or services.  Transaction fees were paid by the content provider. For payments under $5, the charge was 15% of the price paid by the buyer (Bitpass Professional merchant account fee). BitPass also partnered with major technology and financial services companies such as Microsoft, PayPal, the Royal Bank of Scotland and First Data.

On January 19, 2007 Bitpass announced that they were shutting down, and operations officially closed on January 26, 2007.

Mperia

Mperia was an online music store founded in 2003 by BitPass to use the BitPass payment system. Launched by Huang and Joshua Ellis, it was aimed toward allowing independent musicians to sell their music online.  Artists could upload their own music directly, and could price their own music, with tracking costing between US$0.25 and US$1.50. No digital rights management features were permitted. Artists kept 70% of each track's revenue.

In 2004, Mperia partnered with CD Baby to sell tracks from CDBaby's catalog.

With the shutdown of BitPass, Mperia also shut down in early 2007.

References

External links 
 Bitpass site
 Misunderstanding Micropayments - article by cartoonist Scott McCloud about micropayments and Bitpass

Payment systems
Digital currencies
Companies based in San Mateo, California
American companies established in 2002
Financial services companies established in 2002
Financial services companies disestablished in 2007
Mperia
Mperia
Defunct online music stores
Defunct digital music services or companies
2002 establishments in California
Defunct online companies of the United States